This is a list of eco-horror films.

Criteria
These are some natural horror films and other films in the horror genre whose plots include mention of ecological issues. Also included are documentaries dealing with the possible disastrous ecological consequences of human activity.

Documentaries

The Hellstrom Chronicle (1971)
An Inconvenient Truth (2006; global warming)
The 11th Hour (2007; the state of the natural environment)
Gasland (2010)

Fictional

 King Kong (1933)
 The Beast From 20,000 Fathoms (1953)
 Creature from the Black Lagoon (1954)
 Godzilla (1954)
 Them! (1954; about atomically mutated ants)
 It Came from Beneath the Sea (1955)
 Tarantula (1955)
 Attack of the Crab Monsters (1957)
 Beginning of the End (1957)
 The Birds (1963)
 Deliverance (1972)
 Frogs (1972)
 Night of the Lepus (1972; about giant killer rabbits)
 Silent Running (1972)
 The Wicker Man (1973)
 Phase IV (1974)
 Jaws (1975)
 Grizzly (1976)
 Day of the Animals (1977)
 Kingdom of the Spiders (1977)
 Attack of the Killer Tomatoes (1978)
 Long Weekend (1978; animals turn hostile towards a young couple who disrespect nature)
 Piranha (1978)
 The Swarm (1978; about killer bees)
 The China Syndrome (1979)
 Prophecy (1979)
 Alligator (1980)
 C.H.U.D. (1984)
 The Toxic Avenger (1984)
 The Quiet Earth (1985)
 The Stuff (1985)
 Troll 2 (1990)
 Cronos (1993)
 Jurassic Park (1993; about cloning dinosaurs)
 Safe (1995; about suburban pollution)
 Waterworld (1995)
 Outbreak (1995; about a deadly virus outbreak)
 Mimic (1997)
 The Day After Tomorrow (2004)
 The Last Winter (2006; oil drilling in Alaska awakes slumbering forces)
 The Happening (2008; plants release a toxin as a defense mechanism)
 The Road (2009)
 The Book of Eli (2010)
 Take Shelter (2011)
 The Bay (2012; about the Chesapeake Bay water quality problems)
 Snowpiercer (2013)
 Harbinger (2016; about the poisonous effects of fracking)
 Us (2019)
 Unearth (2020; about the consequences of fracking)
In the Earth (2021)

See also
 List of disaster films
 List of films featuring giant monsters
 List of natural horror films
 List of environmental films
 RiffTrax

References

Sources

 
 
 
 
 

Eco-horror
1950s in film
1970s in film
1980s in film
1990s in film
2000s in film
2010s in film
2020s in film
Documentary film